Ikot Ebiyak is a village in Etinan local government area of Akwa Ibom State.

References

Villages in Akwa Ibom